Málfríður Erna Sigurðardóttir (born 30 May 1984) is an Icelandic footballer who plays as a defender for Valur in the Úrvalsdeild kvenna the top-tier women's football league in Iceland.

Career

Club
Málfríður Erna started her professional career at Valur in the top-tier women's football league in Iceland. She played for Valur for 15 years before signing with Breiðablik in 2015, where she spent two seasons. In 2017, Málfríður Erna returned to Valur.

International
Málfríður Erna debuted for Iceland U17 on July 3, 2000, in a match against Germany. She participated in several youth competitions for Iceland U7, U20, and U21 teams. On February 13, 2003, she debuted for Iceland Senior Team in a match against the United States. Málfríður Erna represented Iceland in several important competitions at senior level, including the UEFA Women's Euro 2017.

References

External links
 
 
 

1984 births
Living people
Malfridur Erna Sigurdardottir
Malfridur Erna Sigurdardottir
Women's association football defenders
Malfridur Erna Sigurdardottir
Malfridur Erna Sigurdardottir
UEFA Women's Euro 2017 players